The Arvand Free Zone with an area of 37,400 hectares is at the confluence of the Karun and Arvand (Shatt al-Arab) rivers. The Zone is located at a height of three meters above sea level and in proximity to Iraq and in the north west of Persian Gulf.

Special fertility of the area is due to sediments having been accumulated in the lowlands for the past millions years ago. The average temperature in the Zone since the beginning of the year until mid-autumn is 48 °C and will reach to 8 °C during other days of the year and the annual average rainfall is about 188 millimeters. Distance of the Zone to the center of Khuzestan Province is about 120 kilometers and its distance to Imam Khomeini Port and Mahshahr Port, as the two main industrial and transit centers, is 80 kilometers. The connection road with the length of 1000 kilometers connects the capital of the country to Persian Gulf through this Zone. Existence of the two freshwater rivers of Karun and Bahmanshir flowing through the Zone is of the natural benefits of the Zone and it has special importance in providing the freshwater required for industrial and home units.

This Zone has long been one of the border and oil rich zones of the country due to the existence of freshwater Rivers of Karun and Arvand and also transportation facilities including road, rail, sea and air. It has been led to the establishment of the first oil refinery of the Middle East and the largest trade Port of the country. Special features of the Zone are the existence of fertile lands, possibility of fishing and its people having a special trade culture. Also, language, culture and kinship relations of the people with the neighboring countries are of the unique advantages of the Zone. Generally, Arvand Free Zone Org. is the largest regional-national project of Khuzestan Province and its implementation has big impacts on social and commercial criteria of the Zone. Great volume of investments, complexity of the engaged systems, necessity of systematic relations among executing factors, investigation and analysis of the situation and collection of managerial regulations are in line with target of creating a comprehensive, technical and economic view and in compliance with the situation. Lands of this Zone have been allocated to industrial activities, and other sectors, such as trade, tourism and office, to ports, warehousing and transit, and investors can invest in any of the economic activities.

Visa-free
Holders of normal passports travelling as tourists can enter Arvand Free Zone without a visa with maximum stay of 2 weeks (extendable), as by December 2017.

Admission refused
Admission is refused to holders of passports or travel documents containing an Israeli visa or stamp or any data showing that visitor has been to Israel or indication of any connection with the state of Israel during the last 12 months.

See also
 Politics of Khuzestan

References

External links
 Iran Free Zones official website
 Arvand Free Zone Organization official website
 "Making Waves", The Guardian, March 30, 2007
Foreign trade of Iran
Khuzestan Province
Special economic zones
ثبت طرح صنعتی و نشان تجاری در سطح بین الملل-international patent